Asterostemma may refer to:
 Asterostemma depressa, an extinct species of mammals in the family Chlamyphoridae
 Asterostemma (plant), a genus of flowering plants in the family Apocynaceae